Shorgoghal is a traditional Azerbaijani pastry in a round shape filled with anise or fennel seed, cumin, cinnamon, turmeric, salt and pepper. It is mainly prepared for Novruz in Azerbaijan along with pakhlava and shekerbura.

About 
Goghal is a round, flaky pastry with bright yellow top layer. It is mainly filled with a mixture of spices (called shorgoghal) or with sugar and nuts (called shirin goghal). Like other pastries prepared for Nowruz in Azerbaijan, shorgoghal has a solar symbolism, its round shape and cheerful yellow colour inspired by the life-giving sun, whose power waxes stronger after the vernal equinox, ushering in the quickening warmth of Spring.

Ingredients and preparation 
Puff pastry dough is rested in a warm place for 4 hours, then enriched with heated butter, after which it is mixed well and the remaining flour is added. 

Cumin is crushed and heated, then anise, cinnamon, salt and pepper are added together with warm butter for the stuffing. The mixture is cooked for 5 minutes. 

The dough is divided into 10 pieces. The rolled-out pieces are then smeared with butter and placed on top of each other. The multilayered dough thus formed is cut into strips, which are twisted into circles and then flattened. The dough is then stuffed with the buttery spice mixture and the top of each shorgoghal is brushed  with egg yolk coloured with saffron and sprinkled with poppy seeds.

See also 

 Shekerbura
 Azerbaijani pakhlava
 Novruz in Azerbaijan
 List of pastries

References 

Azerbaijani desserts